Fazer is a Finnish food company.

Fazer may also refer to:

 Fazer (rapper), English rapper
 The Yamaha Fazer series of motorcycles
 Yamaha FZS600 Fazer
 Yamaha FZ6 (also known as the FZ6 Fazer in some markets)
 Yamaha FZ8 and FAZER8
 Yamaha FZ1 (also known as the FZ1 Fazer in some markets)
 Fazer, an album by Sun Dial

See also
 Yamaha Phazer, a snowmobile
 Phaser (disambiguation)
 Phasor (disambiguation)